Dunn's emo skink (Emoia similis) is a species of lizard in the family Scincidae. It is found in Indonesia.

References

Emoia
Reptiles described in 1927
Reptiles of Indonesia
Endemic fauna of Indonesia
Taxa named by Emmett Reid Dunn